Željko Filipović (born 3 October 1988) is a retired Slovenian professional footballer who played as a defensive midfielder.

Career

Club
In 2018 Filipović played for Dynamo Brest in Belarus. He left the club in December 2018. On 6 February 2019, FC Atyrau announced the signing of Filipović. In June 2019 he announced in an interview that he had left the club. On 26 July 2019, Filipović signed a two-year-deal with Serbian club Vojvodina.

Honours
Koper
Slovenian Supercup: 2010

Maribor
Slovenian PrvaLiga: 2010–11, 2011–12, 2012–13, 2013–14, 2014–15
Slovenian Cup: 2011–12, 2012–13, 2015–16
Slovenian Supercup: 2012, 2013, 2014

References

External links
NZS profile 

1988 births
Living people
Footballers from Ljubljana
Slovenian footballers
Association football midfielders
Slovenia international footballers
Slovenian expatriate footballers
Expatriate footballers in Belgium
Expatriate footballers in Belarus
Expatriate footballers in Morocco
Expatriate footballers in Kazakhstan
Expatriate footballers in Serbia
Slovenian expatriate sportspeople in Belgium
Slovenian expatriate sportspeople in Serbia
Slovenian PrvaLiga players
Belarusian Premier League players
Kazakhstan Premier League players
Serbian SuperLiga players
NK Domžale players
NK Olimpija Ljubljana (2005) players
FC Koper players
NK Maribor players
K.V. Mechelen players
FC Dynamo Brest players
Ittihad Tanger players
FC Atyrau players
FK Vojvodina players
Slovenian football managers